Tims Fork is a stream in the U.S. state of West Virginia.

Tims Fork was named after Timothy Wallace, a pioneer settler.

See also
List of rivers of West Virginia

References

Rivers of Logan County, West Virginia
Rivers of West Virginia